Classica may refer to:

Classical music
Classica (magazine), a French classical music magazine
Classica HD, an Italian speciality television channel
Stingray Classica, a speciality television channel in Germany owned by Stingray Digital
Clássica (Daniela Mercury album), by Brazilian singer Daniela Mercury
Classica (Novembre album), by Italian heavy metal band Novembre